Eduardo Antonio Bacas Rojas (born December 20, 1953 in Tucumán, Argentina) is an Argentine football manager and former player who played as a midfielder. He was also part of Argentina's squad for the 1979 Copa América tournament.

References

External links
 
 
 mediotiempo.com

1953 births
Living people
Sportspeople from Tucumán Province
Argentine footballers
Association football midfielders
Argentine expatriate footballers
Argentine Primera División players
Liga MX players
Rosario Central footballers
Club América footballers
Tigres UANL footballers
Expatriate footballers in Mexico
Argentine football managers